Brad Leighton (born June 12, 1962) is an American former stock car racing driver. He competed in five career Busch Series events in his career.

Leighton made his career debut at New Hampshire International Speedway in May 1997, running the #5 Chevy owned by Terry Labonte. He started the race in 30th and only managed to move to 27th by the end of the day after a late crash. However, Leighton did lead one lap—an impressive stat in his first career start.

In 1999, Leighton made four more starts, all for BACE Motorsports. In his season debut, he finished 34th at Nazareth Speedway despite fatigue. He was last at Watkins Glen due to transmission failure, 37th at Milwaukee and 36th at IRP. Not only was Milwaukee the only race he finished in 1999, it was the site of his best career start, at 23rd.

Leighton's poor results, however, led to his lack of a ride for 2000, and he has not raced in the Busch Series since. He however had had a productive career in the Busch North Series, winning back-to-back championships in 1999 and 2000.

Motorsports career results

NASCAR
(key) (Bold – Pole position awarded by qualifying time. Italics – Pole position earned by points standings or practice time. * – Most laps led.)

Busch Series

External links

Living people
1962 births
People from Center Harbor, New Hampshire
Racing drivers from New Hampshire
NASCAR drivers